4 Aquilae, abbreviated 4 Aql, is a single, white-hued star in the equatorial constellation of Aquila. 4 Aquilae is the Flamsteed designation. It has an apparent visual magnitude of 5.02, making it a faint star visible to the naked eye. It is moving closer to the Earth with a heliocentric radial velocity of −13 km/s.

This is a B-type main-sequence star with a stellar classification of B9 V. It was classed as a Be star by Arne Sletteback in 1982, indicating it has ionized circumstellar gas. The star is spinning rapidly, showing a projected rotational velocity of 259 km/s, and is being viewed almost equator-on. It has 3.6 times the mass of the Sun and 3 times the Sun's radius. The star is radiating 294 times the Sun's luminosity from its photosphere at an effective temperature of 10,965 K.

References

B-type main-sequence stars
Be stars
Aquila (constellation)
Durchmusterung objects
Aquilae, 04
173370
091975
7040